Glycosmis decipiens is a species of plant in the family Rutaceae. It is endemic to Peninsular Malaysia. It is threatened by habitat loss. A population is protected in Taman Negara.

References

decipiens
Endemic flora of Peninsular Malaysia
Conservation dependent plants
Taxonomy articles created by Polbot